is an underground metro station located in the city of Moriguchi, Osaka, Japan, operated by Osaka Metro.

Lines
Moriguchi Station is a station of the Tanimachi Line, and is located 1.8 km from the terminus of the line at Dainichi Station.

Station layout
The station has one underground island platform serving two tracks and fenced with platform gates.

Platforms

History
The station was opened on April 6, 1977

Passenger statistics
In fiscal 2019, the station was used by an average of 15,445 passengers daily.

Surrounding area
Moriguchi City Hall
Moriguchi City Central Public Hall
Moriguchi Civic Center (Satsuki Hall Moriguchi)
Osaka Prefectural Yodogawa Technical High School 
 Osaka Prefectural Ashima High School

See also
List of railway stations in Japan

References

External links

Official home page 

Osaka Metro stations
Railway stations in Japan opened in 1977
Railway stations in Osaka Prefecture
Moriguchi, Osaka